Line 1 is a line on the Brussels Metro in Belgium operated by STIB/MIVB. It has existed in its current form since 4 April 2009, when the former line 1B, which ran between Stockel/Stokkel and Erasme/Erasmus, was shortened to Gare de l'Ouest/Weststation. The section between West station and Erasme is now served by line 5. The line serves 21 metro stations, and has a common section with line 5 between West station and Mérode station, and with lines 2 and 6 between West station and Beekkant. At Arts-Loi/Kunst-Wet the line also connects with lines 2 and 6. Railway connections are possible at Brussels-Central railway station, Schuman station, Mérode and West stations.  The line crosses the municipalities of Molenbeek-Saint-Jean, Koekelberg, City of Brussels, Etterbeek, Woluwe-Saint-Pierre and Woluwe-Saint-Lambert.

The first section of this line was built in the late 1960s between Schuman station and De Brouckère, but was served by trams. The first metro was brought into service on 20 September 1976, and the existing underground section was extended up to Tomberg on line 1B, and up to Beaulieu on line 1A. Line 1B was later expanded to the west, to Saint Catherine in 1977, to Beekkant in 1981, to Saint-Guidon/Sint-Guido in 1982, to Veeweyde/Veeweide in 1985, to Bizet in 1992 and finally to Erasme in 2003. The line was expanded to the east, to Alma in 1982 and to Stockel in 1988.

Future
As the line was congested at peak hours, STIB made plans in 2004 to divert some traffic via construction of a new leg of the metro. Under provisional plans, it would have run from Merode to Trône via new stops in Jean Rey Square and Brussels-Luxembourg railway station. However, these plans were not mentioned again in subsequent years.

References

External links
Brussels metro and tram network map with dates of entry into service of individual sections
STIB/MIVB official website

1
City of Brussels
Etterbeek
Koekelberg
Molenbeek-Saint-Jean
Woluwe-Saint-Lambert
Woluwe-Saint-Pierre